Once Again may refer to:

Film and television
Once Again (2012 film), an Indian Hindi-language family drama film
Once Again (2016 film) or Pinneyum, an Indian Malayalam-language romantic crime drama film
Once Again (2018 film), an Indian Hindi-language romantic drama film
Once Again (Philippine TV series), a 2016 romantic fantasy series
Once Again (South Korean TV series), a 2020 romantic comedy-drama series

Music

Albums
Once Again (Barclay James Harvest album), 1971
Once Again (Fusebox album) or the title song, 2004
Once Again (John Legend album), 2006
Once Again (The Kingston Trio album), 2004
Once Again (Peter Tork and James Lee Stanley album), 2001
Once Again, by the American Breed, 1986

Songs
"1nce Again", by A Tribe Called Quest, 1996
"Once Again", by Days of the New from Days of the New, 2001
"Once Again", by Headhunterz, 2015
"Once Again", by Quality Control with Lil Yachty and Tee Grizzley from Control the Streets, Volume 2, 2019

See also
Once and Again, a 1999–2002 American drama television series